Parental Guidance is a Singaporean drama produced by local TV station MediaCorp and airs on MediaCorp Channel 5 on Thursdays at 8.30pm starting on 8 February 2007 to 3 May 2007 for a total of 13 episodes.

Cast

Episodes

Season One

Season 2

External links
 Parental Guidance on XinMSN
 IMDB Page

Singaporean television sitcoms
2007 Singaporean television series debuts
Channel 5 (Singapore) original programming